The 1980 Canadian Ladies Curling Association Championship, (nicknamed "The Lassie"), the Canadian women's curling championship, was held from February 23 to March 1, 1980 at Northlands Gardens in Edmonton, Alberta. Attendance for the event was just 4,538, with about 700 witnessing the final.

Team Saskatchewan, who was skipped by Marj Mitchell captured the championship by defeating Nova Scotia in the final 6–5. Saskatchewan had previously defeated British Columbia 7–4 in a tiebreaker and Ontario 7–5 in the semifinal. This was Saskatchewan's eighth title and first since  and the only championship won by Mitchell. This was also Mitchell's last appearance in the national championship as she lost her battle with cancer in 1983.

Mitchell's rink would go onto represent Canada in the 1980 Royal Bank of Scotland World Women's Curling Championship, the women's world curling championship, which they also won.

Teams
The teams are listed as follows:

Round Robin standings
Final Round Robin standings

Tiebreakers

Playoffs

Semifinal

Final

References
Soudog

Scotties Tournament of Hearts
Canadian Ladies Curling Association Championship, 1980
Curling competitions in Edmonton
February 1980 sports events in Canada
March 1980 sports events in Canada
1980 in Alberta
1980 in women's curling